Georgia is a town in Franklin County, Vermont, United States. The population was 4,845 at the 2020 census.

Geography
The town occupies the southwest corner of Franklin County, bordered to the south by Chittenden County. The western border of the town is within Lake Champlain and its St. Albans Bay. St. Albans, the Franklin County seat, is to the north. U.S. Route 7 passes through the town, as does Interstate 89, which crosses US-7 at Exit 18 in the southeast part of town. Both highways lead north to St. Albans and south to Burlington.

The Lamoille River crosses the southeast corner of the town.

History
Georgia was named after King George III by New Hampshire, which was meant to sway the king in a land dispute over Vermont between New York and New Hampshire, both of which claimed to have the rights to the land.

Demographics

As of the census of 2000, there were 4,375 people, 1,484 households, and 1,231 families residing in the town.  The population density was 110.8 people per square mile (42.8/km2).  There were 1,654 housing units at an average density of 41.9 per square mile (16.2/km2).  The racial makeup of the town was 98.31% White, 0.25% African American, 0.16% Native American, 0.25% Asian, 0.02% Pacific Islander, 0.23% from other races, and 0.78% from two or more races. Hispanic or Latino of any race were 0.57% of the population.

There were 1,484 households, out of which 46.2% had children under the age of 18 living with them, 72.1% were couples living together and joined in either marriage or civil union, 7.4% had a female householder with no husband present, and 17.0% were non-families. 12.3% of all households were made up of individuals, and 4.2% had someone living alone who was 65 years of age or older.  The average household size was 2.94 and the average family size was 3.20.

In the town, the population was spread out, with 31.2% under the age of 18, 5.9% from 18 to 24, 34.1% from 25 to 44, 22.7% from 45 to 64, and 6.1% who were 65 years of age or older.  The median age was 34 years. For every 100 females, there were 101.7 males.

The median income for a household in the town was $54,156, and the median income for a family was $59,712. Males had a median income of $37,294 versus $26,090 for females. The per capita income for the town was $20,888.  About 1.9% of families and 3.8% of the population were below the poverty line, including 2.8% of those under age 18 and 9.0% of those age 65 or over.

Notable people 

 J. Allen Barber (1809–1881), politician
 Daniel Bliss (1823–1916), missionary; founder of American University of Beirut
 Jeffrey Brace (1742–1827), American Revolutionary War, Black Patriot soldier, farmer, author, and first African-American citizen of Poultney, Vermont
 Gardner Quincy Colton (1814–1898), scientist
 James M. Hotchkiss (1812–1877), member of the Vermont House of Representatives and Vermont Senate
 Martha Austin Phelps (1870–1933), chemist
 Hester Martha Poole (1833/1834–1932), writer, artist, advocate
 Alvah Sabin (1793–1885), US congressman
 George J. Stannard (1820–1886), farmer, teacher, Civil War general
 Armando Vilaseca, commissioner of the Vermont Department of Education
 Mehitable E. Woods (1813–1891), hero of the American Civil War

References

External links
 Town of Georgia official website

 
Towns in Vermont
Burlington, Vermont metropolitan area
Towns in Franklin County, Vermont